Nikhil Chaudhary is an environmentalist, urban-planner, architect, and cartoonist from Maharashtra, India. His work has been featured as contributing to a growing movement to use comics as advocacy tools for environmental and urban issues. He is a contributing author to the recent book, Longform: An Anthology of Graphic Narratives. Most recently, his work was featured in the documentary-series, Compass by the TRT World - on an episode investigating the role of art and artists addressing Gentrification.

References

Indian comics artists
Living people
20th-century Indian male writers
Activists from Maharashtra
English-language writers from India
Hindi-language writers
Indian cartoonists
Indian comics writers
Indian environmentalists
Year of birth missing (living people)